Yengorga is a rural locality (an ulus) in Tunkinsky District, Republic of Buryatia, Russia. The population was 21 as of 2010. There is 1 street.

Geography 
Yengorga is located 73 km north of Kyren (the district's administrative centre) by road.

References 

Rural localities in Tunkinsky District